Pumpkin Run is a tributary to the Monongahela River in southwestern Pennsylvania.  The stream rises in northeastern Greene and flows north entering the Monongahela River at Rices Landing, Pennsylvania. The watershed is roughly 31% agricultural, 58% forested and the rest is other uses.  The population in the watershed is 931 (2010).

References

Rivers of Pennsylvania
Tributaries of the Monongahela River
Rivers of Greene County, Pennsylvania
Allegheny Plateau